Swamp Thing is a DC Comics character.

Swamp Thing may also refer to:

Uses related to the comics character
 Swamp Thing (comic book), several comics series
 Swamp Thing (1982 film), a 1982 film, and a sequel
 Swamp Thing (video game), a 1992 game based on the animated series
 Swamp Thing (1990 TV series), a live-action series
 Swamp Thing (1991 TV series), an animated series
 Swamp Thing (2019 TV series), a live-action series
 Swamp Thing (upcoming film), an upcoming film

Music
 Swamp Thing (band), a New Zealand blues band
 Swamp Thing (album), by Malcolm McLaren, 1985
 "Swamp Thing" (song), by The Grid, 1994
 "Swamp Thing", a song by the Chameleons from Strange Times
 "Swamp Thing", a song by Juno Reactor from Bible of Dreams

Other uses
 Swamp Thing (Wild Adventures), a roller coaster at Wild Adventures theme park near Valdosta, Georgia, U.S.
 Swamp Thing, a fictional character in the film Con Air
 Swampman, a thought experiment in philosophy

See also
 Swamp (disambiguation)
 Man-Thing